This is an index of nursing articles on Wikipedia.

A

B

C

H

I

L

M

N

P

R

S

T

U

W

Nursing